de la Croix is a French surname meaning "of the Cross". Notable people with the surname include:

Blane De St. Croix (1954-), American artist
Charles de la Croix (1792–1869), Flemish Roman Catholic missionary
Charles Eugène Gabriel de La Croix (1727–1801), French marshal
David de la Croix (1964-), Belgian scholar
Étienne de la Croix (1579–1643), French Jesuit, missionary and writer
Félix du Temple de la Croix (1823–1890), French naval officer and inventor
François Pétis de la Croix (1653–1713), French orientalist
Jean Louis de la Croix, French archer
Pierre Frédéric de la Croix (1709-1782), Dutch painter
Raven De La Croix (born 1947), American actress
St. Sukie de la Croix (born 1951), American writer
Susanna de la Croix (1755-1789), Dutch Painter

See also
Delacroix
Delcroix
Col de la Croix (disambiguation)
Saint-Jean-de-la-Croix

French-language surnames